The Tenth Circle is a 2008 Canadian drama/mystery television film directed by Peter Markle and starring Kelly Preston, Ron Eldard, Jamie Johnston, Britt Robertson, and Haley Beauchamp. It is based on a Jodi Picoult novel of the same name. The film premiered on June 28, 2008, on Lifetime.

Plot
When freshman Trixie Stone (Brittany Robertson) accuses her ex-boyfriend Jason Underhill (Jamie Johnston) of raping her, everyone is quick to take his side when he claims their intercourse was consensual. Trixie's parents, Daniel (Ron Eldard), a mild mannered comic book artist from a harsh background, and Laura (Kelly Preston), a college professor of literature sleeping with one of her students, become involved. After questioning Trixie and conducting a blood test it is revealed that Trixie was drugged, and people begin to believe that she was really raped. Jason, whose life is supposedly ruined, leaps from a bridge. Although first presumed to be suicide, Trixie and her father are later suspected of pushing him off the bridge. After the police call Daniel requesting blood samples from him and Trixie to compare to blood found under Jason's fingernails, he attempts to flee with her in his car but is soon stopped by the police, and he then tells Trixie that he was the one who pushed Jason off the bridge.

Daniel is brought in to the police station and confesses to pushing Jason, but is then brought to another room with Laura inside. Laura confesses to Daniel that she was there when Jason died. Jason (who was drunk) and Laura get into an argument as he is standing outside the bridge rails and in the struggle he loses his balance and falls off the bridge. Laura tries to grab him but is unable to pull him up and he falls down leaving scratches on Laura's hands. The police decide not to press charges against Laura and the whole family is released.

The title of the film is based on the notion in Dante's Divine Comedy that hell is divided into nine circles. In one of the final scenes of the movie, Laura, who is teaching the Divine Comedy in college, says that there must be a tenth circle in hell, kept for those who hurt their beloved ones and kept acting as if everything was as usual.

Cast
 Britt Robertson as Trixie Stone
 Kelly Preston as Laura Stone
 Ron Eldard as Daniel Stone
 Jamie Johnston as Jason Underhill
 Michael Riley as Mike Bartholomy
 Haley Beauchamp as Zepher Santorelli
 Geordie Brown as Moss Minton
 Gil Anderson as Shakina
 Gary Levert as Mr. Underhill
 Deborah Post as Mrs. Underhill
 Jon Cor as Seth
 Leah Fassett as Jessica
 Mauralea Austin as Marita
 Gharrett Patrick Paon as Wise Ass Kid

Production
The film was shot in Windsor, Nova Scotia.

References

External links
 
 
 

2008 television films
2008 films
Canadian drama television films
Canadian mystery films
English-language Canadian films
2000s thriller films
Films based on works by Jodi Picoult
Films shot in Nova Scotia
Lifetime (TV network) films
Films directed by Peter Markle
Sony Pictures direct-to-video films
2000s Canadian films